Taichung is a special municipality in Taiwan.

Taichung may also refer to:

 National Taichung Theater, an opera house in Taichung
 Port of Taichung, the second largest port in Taiwan
 Taichung Bank, a Taiwanese bank
 Taichung BRT, a former bus rapid transit system 
 Taichung City Bus, a bus network
 Taichung County (1945 and 2010), a former county of Taiwan
 Taichung Intercontinental Baseball Stadium, a stadium Taichung
 Taichung line, a railway line in Taichung
 Taichung Metro, the Taichung metro system
 Taichung Mosque, a mosque in Taichung
 Taichung Park, a park in Taichung
 Taichung Power Plant, a power plant in Taichung
 Taichung Prefectural Hall, a former government building in Taichung 
 Taichung railway station, a railway station in Taichung
 Taichung Suns, a professional basketball team in Taichung

See also
 Taizong (disambiguation)